The Five Faces of Manfred Mann is the debut British and second American studio album by Manfred Mann. It was first released in the United Kingdom on 11 September 1964 by His Master's Voice. In late October/early November, the album was released in Canada by Capitol Records. The Canadian track listing was almost the same as the UK version, except it included the hit "Do Wah Diddy Diddy" instead of "I've Got My Mojo Working". The record has been called "one of the great blues-based British invasion albums; it's a hot, rocking record that benefits from some virtuoso playing as well".

Background
The songs on the original version of the Five Faces of Manfred Mann are R&B, including the band's cover versions of Howlin' Wolf's "Smokestack Lightning", Muddy Waters' "Got My Mojo Working", and Bo Diddley's "Bring It to Jerome", as well as a few of the group's own jazzy compositions. Particularly noticeable in the instrumental sections are Manfred Mann's keyboard work, Mike Vickers flute and saxophone work, and Mike Hugg's vibes. The album includes the Cannonball Adderley song "Sack O' Woe" from the R&B-influenced school of early 1960s jazz.

Bruce Eder of AllMusic writes:

Reception
In his retrospective review of the US release, critic Bruce Eder wrote "The band's second American LP (which shares its title with their first British album) was slightly less impressive than their first, but was still a respectable mix of R&B and pop. For pop, there were "Sha La La" and "Come Tomorrow," two of their biggest mid-'60s hits, and "She," one of their best self-penned efforts in that vein. For R&B, there was the original "Hubble Bubble (Toil and Trouble)," a British hit, and some good covers, notably "I'm Your Kingpin," "Groovin'," and "Dashing Away with the Smoothing Iron," drawn from a then-recent British EP release.

Track listing

Side one

"Smokestack Lightning" (Chester Burnett) – 2:30
"Don't Ask Me What I Say" (Paul Jones) – 3:09
"Sack O' Woe" (Cannonball Adderley) – 3:31
"What You Gonna Do?" (Jones, Manfred Mann) – 3:03
"I'm Your Hoochie Coochie Man" (Willie Dixon) – 2:10
"I'm Your Kingpin" (Mann, Jones) – 2:38
"Down the Road Apiece" (Don Raye) – 3:16

Side two

"Got My Mojo Working" (Preston Foster; credited to Muddy Waters) – 2:43
Canadian version: "Do Wah Diddy Diddy" (Jeff Barry, Ellie Greenwich) – 2:23
"It's Gonna Work Out Fine" (Rose Marie McCoy, Sylvia McKinney; credited to Joe Seneca, J. Lee) – 2:33
"Mr. Anello" (Mike Hugg, Jones, Mann, Tom McGuinness, Mike Vickers) – 2:15
"Untie Me" (Joe South) – 3:41
"Bring It to Jerome" (Jerome Green) – 3:31
"Without You" (Jones) – 2:25
"You've Got to Take It" (Jones) – 2:00

US version 

The American version of the album (their second U.S. release following The Manfred Mann Album) was released on 8 February 1965 by Ascot Records (a subsidiary of United Artists) with a very different track listing. This version is more pop-oriented than its predecessor The Manfred Mann Album, as it features "Sha La La", "Come Tomorrow", and "Hubble Bubble (Toil and Trouble)"; as well as compositions made by lead singer Paul Jones and the traditional American folk number "John Hardy". It also features a smaller section of the band's R&B and jazz influences. It is essentially a whole different album, sharing only two songs with the UK release ("I'm Your Kingpin" and "You've Got to Take It"): the majority of the album already appeared on The Manfred Mann Album.

Side one

According to the Sundazed reissue:
"Sha La La" (Robert Mosley, Robert Napoleon Taylor) – 2:30
"Come Tomorrow" (Bob Elgin, Frank Augustus, Dolores Phillips) – 2:13
"She" (Jones) – 2:10
"Can't Believe It" (Jones) – 3:19
"John Hardy" (Traditional) – 2:01
"Did You Have to Do That" (Jones) – 3:29

Side two

"Watermelon Man" (Herbie Hancock) – 2:12
"I'm Your Kingpin" (Jones, Mann) – 2:38
"Hubble Bubble (Toil and Trouble)" (Mann, Hugg, Vickers, Jones, McGuinness) – 2:25
"You've Got to Take It" (Jones) – 2:00
"Groovin'" (Ben E. King, James Bethea) – 3:40
"Dashing Away with the Smoothing Iron" (Mann, Hugg, Vickers, Jones, McGuinness) – 1:59

Personnel
Manfred Mann
 Manfred Mann – keyboards, backing vocals
 Paul Jones – lead vocals, harmonica
 Mike Vickers – guitars, saxes, flutes, backing vocals
 Tom McGuinness – bass, backing vocals
 Mike Hugg – drums, percussion, vibes
 Dave Richmond – bass on "Without You"

Production
 John Burgess – producer, mixing
 Norman Smith – engineer

Charts 
The Five Faces of Manfred Mann peaked at number 3 on the UK Albums Chart and is the band's highest charting release on that chart. The U.S. version also charted on the Billboard 200, spending four weeks on the chart and peaking at number 141 on 20 March 1965.

Release history

References 

1964 debut albums
1965 albums
Manfred Mann albums
EMI Records albums
Capitol Records albums
United Artists Records albums